Wisalla (Aymara wisa the first-born of twins, -lla a suffix, 'little first-born twin', Hispanicized spelling Huisalla) is a  mountain in the Andes of Bolivia. It is situated in the Oruro Department, Sajama Province, Curahuara de Carangas Municipality. Wisalla lies south-west of the dormant Sajama volcano.

References 

Mountains of Oruro Department